Easy read is a method of presenting written information to make it easier to understand for people with difficulty reading.

Easy read advocates sentences of no more than ten to fifteen words, with each sentence having just one idea and one verb. Active sentences are used instead of passive sentences. Easy read is closely edited, to express ideas in a small number of simple words. Any difficult word or idea is explained in a separate sentence.

The plain English statement: "Thank you for your letter asking for permission to put up posters in the library. Before we can give you an answer we will need to see a copy of the posters to make sure they won't offend anyone." could be rewritten in easy read as follows:
"Thank you for your letter about your poster. We need to see the poster before we put it up. This is because it must not upset people."

An easy read document is usually presented in at least 14-point text, in a sans-serif font, is limited to 24 pages of content, and includes carefully selected images to help people understand.

The UK government promotes the use of easy read across the public sector, in order to increase access to public services.

In Australia, in response to research conducted with the community and public sector staff, the South Australian government promotes the broad benefits of easy read in their Online Accessibility Toolkit.

References

External links
an example of an Easy read document published in Australia in 2019.

Accessible information